Billy Dean is the second studio album by the American country music artist of the same name, released in 1991 by Capitol Nashville. Like his debut album Young Man, it was certified gold by the RIAA. Four singles were released from the album: "You Don't Count the Cost", "Only the Wind", "Billy the Kid" and "If There Hadn't Been You". "If There Hadn't Been You" was the highest-peaking of these, reaching #3 on the Billboard Hot Country Singles & Tracks (now Hot Country Songs) charts; all the other singles reached #4 on the same chart.

Track listing

Personnel
Bruce Bouton – pedal steel guitar, Dobro
Billy Dean – lead vocals, background vocals, acoustic guitar, electric guitar
Bruce Dees – background vocals
Bill Hullett – acoustic guitar, lap steel guitar
Chuck Jones – acoustic guitar
Julie King – background vocals
Brent Mason – electric guitar
Terry McMillan – harmonica, percussion
Steve Nathan – piano, keyboards
Bob Regan – electric guitar
Tom Shapiro – background vocals
Lisa Silver – background vocals
Harry Stinson – background vocals
Biff Watson – acoustic guitar, electric guitar, classical guitar, piano, keyboards 
John Willis – electric guitar
Dennis Wilson – background vocals
Lonnie Wilson – drums, background vocals
Glenn Worf – bass guitar
Curtis Young – background vocals

Chart performance

References

1991 albums
Billy Dean albums
Capitol Records albums